Lost Paradise is a 2004 novel by the Dutch writer Cees Nooteboom. It tells the story of two Brazilian women who move to Australia, and of a Dutch middle-aged critic who goes to an Alpine spa.

Reception
The book was reviewed in Publishers Weekly: "Framed by masterful reflections on misunderstandings in life and literature, Nooteboom's short work, at once delicate and chiseled, achieves a dreamlike suspension of time and place."

See also
 2004 in literature
 Dutch literature

References

2004 novels
Dutch-language novels
21st-century Dutch novels
Novels by Cees Nooteboom